Abyssobrotula is a genus of cusk eel in the family Ophidiidae.

Species
There are currently 2 recognized species in this genus:
 Abyssobrotula galatheae J. G. Nielsen, 1977
 Abyssobrotula hadropercularis Ohashi & J. G. Nielsen, 2016

References

Ophidiidae
 
Deep sea fish